Take Me to Your Leader may refer to:
Take me to your leader (phrase), a cartoon catchphrase, said by extraterrestrial aliens

Music
 Take Me to Your Leader (¡Mayday! album), 2012, or the title song
 "Take Me to Your Leader", a 2008 song by British indie folk band The Conspirators 
 Take Me to Your Leader (Hawkwind album), 2005
 Take Me to Your Leader (King Geedorah album), 2003, or the title song 
 "Take Me to Your Leader", a song by Add N to (X) from Loud Like Nature (2002)
 "Take Me to Your Leader", a song by Hanzel und Gretyl from Transmissions from Uranus (1997)
 Take Me to Your Leader (Newsboys album), 1996, or the title song
 "Take Me to Your Leader" (Incubus song), 1996
 "Take Me to Your Leader: 78-79 Demos", a Wall of Voodoo bootleg release
 "Take Me to Your Leader", a song by The Sinceros from The Sound of Sunbathing (1979)
 "Take Me to Your Leader", a song by Foreigner from Foreigner (1977), serving as a bonus track in the album's re-release
 "Take Me to Your Leader", a 1958 song by Jonathan Winters with Martians

Television episodes
 "Take Me To Your Leader", a 1996 episode of Mighty Ducks: The Animated Series
 "Take Me to Your Leader", an episode of the 1987-1996 TV series Teenage Mutant Ninja Turtles
 "Take Me to Your Leader" (American Horror Story), an episode of the tenth season of American Horror Story
 "The Take Me to Your Leader Affair", the 16th episode in season 3 of The Man from U.N.C.L.E. (1966-67)
 "Take Me to Your Leader Raid", a 1967 episode of The Rat Patrol